The International Rugby Players Special Merit Award is presented at the World Rugby Awards by World Rugby.

Recipients

References

External links 

 World Rugby Awards

World Rugby Awards